Morrison Academy is an international Christian school founded 1952 in Taichung, Taiwan. It primarily caters to the children of missionaries. Beyond the original Taichung location it also maintains a campus in Taipei and Morrison Academy Kaohsiung in Kaohsiung; other satellite campuses have existed in the past.

The school claims to teach from a "Christian perspective" and to use an "American-based" curriculum. The medium of instruction is English.

Curriculum
Morrison Academy's approach to education integrates "Biblical truth with educational knowledge". The academy teaches a Bible curriculum; other subject areas, including science and social studies, are taught to be used from a Christian perspective.

Morrison Academy teaches Earth Science, Life Science, Physical Science, and Engineering and Design in elementary middle school. In high school, the scope and sequence are Biology, Chemistry, Human Anatomy, Physical Science, Physics, AP Biology, and AP Chemistry. Morrison Academy has a "Biblical worldview." The school's science curriculum guide states that, "Morrison Academy insists that God made the universe... Science, as exemplified in the scientific method, is a process that enables all mankind to gain knowledge about creation, the laws that govern it, and the character of God."

Views on marriage
Morrison Academy actively promotes the biblical belief that marriage is "the uniting of one man and one woman in a single, exclusive union" as per Genesis 2:18-25 and that sexual intimacy is "only between a man and a woman who are married to each other" as per Matthew 19:4-6. Although Morrison Academy emphasizes marriage, divorce is not automatic grounds for job termination.

Sports 
Morrison Academy's sports teams compete in the Asian Christian Schools Conference in basketball, in the Far East High School Girls Division II Volleyball Tournament which they won in 2011 and 2012, and in the TAS Tigersharks Invitational Swim.

Notable alumni 
Joy Burke (born 1990), professional basketball player
 Katharine Gun (born 1974), former translator for British intelligence and whistleblower.
 Freya Lim (born 1979), singer.
 David Tao (born 1969), singer-songwriter.

References

External links
 Morrison Academy (Official Site)

 
1952 establishments in Taiwan
Educational institutions established in 1952
International schools in Taipei
American international schools in Taiwan
Nondenominational Christian schools
Buildings and structures in Taichung
Christian schools in Taiwan
Primary schools in Taiwan
Education in Taichung